Óli is a Faroese and Icelandic masculine given name. It is a diminutive of the name Ólafur and Ólavur. People bearing the name Óli include:
 Óli B. Jónsson (1918–2005), Icelandic footballer and manager 
 Óli Jógvansson (born 1969), Faroese songwriter and composer
 Óli Johannesen (born 1972), Faroese footballer 
 Óli Niklái Skaalum (1849–1924), Faroese teacher and politician 

Faroese masculine given names
Icelandic masculine given names